Baluchi (بلوچی) is a city in Pakistan, located in the state of Balochistan. The city is mostly composed of ethnic Baloch residents. It lies on the southernmost border with Iran, and some parts of the city are even officially situated in Iranian territory. The town forms an important part of the Pakistani coastline next to the Arabian sea.

Populated places in Balochistan, Pakistan